Tyramine (also spelled tyramin), also known under several other names, is a naturally occurring trace amine derived from the amino acid tyrosine. Tyramine acts as a catecholamine releasing agent. Notably, it is unable to cross the blood-brain barrier, resulting in only non-psychoactive peripheral sympathomimetic effects following ingestion. A hypertensive crisis can result, however, from ingestion of tyramine-rich foods in conjunction with the use of monoamine oxidase inhibitors (MAOIs).

Occurrence 
Tyramine occurs widely in plants and animals, and is metabolized by various enzymes, including monoamine oxidases. In foods, it often is produced by the decarboxylation of tyrosine during fermentation or decay. Foods that are fermented, cured, pickled, aged, or spoiled have high amounts of tyramine. Tyramine levels go up when foods are at room temperature or go past their freshness date.

Specific foods containing considerable amounts of tyramine include:

 strong or aged cheeses: cheddar, Swiss, Parmesan; Stilton, Gorgonzola or blue cheeses; Camembert, feta, Muenster.
 meats that are cured, smoked, or processed, such as salami, pepperoni, dry sausages, hot dogs, bologna, bacon, corned beef, pickled or smoked fish, caviar, aged chicken livers, soups or gravies made from meat extract.
 pickled or fermented foods: sauerkraut, kimchi, tofu (especially stinky tofu), pickles, miso soup, bean curd, tempeh, sourdough breads
 condiments: soy, shrimp, fish, miso, teriyaki, and bouillon-based sauces.
 drinks: beer (especially tap or home-brewed), vermouth, red wine, sherry, liqueurs.
 beans, vegetables, and fruits: fermented or pickled vegetables, overripe fruits.
 chocolate

Scientists more and more consider tyramine in food as an aspect of safety. They propose projects of regulations aimed to enact control of biogenic amines in food by various strategies, including usage of proper fermentation starters, or preventing their decarboxylase activity. Some authors wrote that this has already given positive results, and tyramine content in food is now lower than it has been in the past.

In plants 
Mistletoe (toxic and not used by humans as a food, but historically used as a medicine).

In animals
Tyramine also plays a role in animals including: In behavioral and motor functions in Caenorhabditis elegans; Locusta migratoria swarming behaviour; and various nervous roles in Rhipicephalus, Apis, Locusta, Periplaneta, Drosophila, Phormia, Papilio, Bombyx, Chilo, Heliothis, Mamestra, Agrotis, and Anopheles.

Physical effects and pharmacology 
Evidence for the presence of tyramine in the human brain has been confirmed by postmortem analysis. Additionally, the possibility that tyramine acts directly as a neuromodulator was revealed by the discovery of a G protein-coupled receptor with high affinity for tyramine, called TAAR1. The TAAR1 receptor is found in the brain, as well as peripheral tissues, including the kidneys. Tyramine binds to TAAR1 as an agonist in humans.

Tyramine is physiologically metabolized by monoamine oxidases (primarily MAO-A), FMO3, PNMT, DBH, and CYP2D6. Human monoamine oxidase enzymes metabolize tyramine into 4-hydroxyphenylacetaldehyde. If monoamine metabolism is compromised by the use of monoamine oxidase inhibitors (MAOIs) and foods high in tyramine are ingested, a hypertensive crisis can result, as tyramine also can displace stored monoamines, such as dopamine, norepinephrine, and epinephrine, from pre-synaptic vesicles. Tyramine is considered a "false neurotransmitter", as it enters noradrenergic nerve terminals and displaces large amounts of norepinephrine, which enters the blood stream and causes vasoconstriction.

Additionally, cocaine has been found to block blood pressure rise that is originally attributed to tyramine, which is explained by the blocking of adrenaline by cocaine from reabsorption to the brain.

The first signs of this effect were discovered by a British pharmacist who noticed that his wife, who at the time was on MAOI medication, had severe headaches when eating cheese. For this reason, it is still called the "cheese reaction" or "cheese crisis," although other foods can cause the same problem.

Most processed cheeses do not contain enough tyramine to cause hypertensive effects, although some aged cheeses (such as Stilton) do.

A large dietary intake of tyramine (or a dietary intake of tyramine while taking MAO inhibitors) can cause the tyramine pressor response, which is defined as an increase in systolic blood pressure of 30 mmHg or more. The increased release of norepinephrine (noradrenaline) from neuronal cytosol or storage vesicles is thought to cause the vasoconstriction and increased heart rate and blood pressure of the pressor response. In severe cases, adrenergic crisis can occur. Although the mechanism is unclear, tyramine ingestion also triggers migraine attacks in sensitive individuals and can even lead to stroke. Vasodilation, dopamine, and circulatory factors are all implicated in the migraines. Double-blind trials suggest that the effects of tyramine on migraine may be adrenergic.

Research reveals a possible link between migraines and elevated levels of tyramine. A 2007 review published in Neurological Sciences 
presented data showing migraine and cluster diseases are characterized by an increase of circulating neurotransmitters and neuromodulators (including tyramine, octopamine, and synephrine) in the hypothalamus, amygdala, and dopaminergic system. People with migraine are over-represented among those with inadequate natural monoamine oxidase, resulting in similar problems to individuals taking MAO inhibitors. Many migraine attack triggers are high in tyramine.

If one has had repeated exposure to tyramine, however, there is a decreased pressor response; tyramine is degraded to octopamine, which is subsequently packaged in synaptic vesicles with norepinephrine (noradrenaline). Therefore, after repeated tyramine exposure, these vesicles contain an increased amount of octopamine and a relatively reduced amount of norepinephrine. When these vesicles are secreted upon tyramine ingestion, there is a decreased pressor response, as less norepinephrine is secreted into the synapse, and octopamine does not activate alpha or beta adrenergic receptors.

When using a MAO inhibitor (MAOI), an intake of approximately 10 to 25 mg of tyramine is required for a severe reaction, compared to 6 to 10 mg for a mild reaction.

The body can reduce tyramine formation by trypsin and chymotrypsin, digestive enzymes in the pancreas.

Biosynthesis
Biochemically, tyramine is produced by the decarboxylation of tyrosine via the action of the enzyme tyrosine decarboxylase.  Tyramine can, in turn, be converted to methylated alkaloid derivatives N-methyltyramine, N,N-dimethyltyramine (hordenine), and N,N,N-trimethyltyramine (candicine).

In humans, tyramine is produced from tyrosine, as shown in the following diagram.

Chemistry
In the laboratory, tyramine can be synthesized in various ways, in particular by the decarboxylation of tyrosine.

Legal status

United States

Tyramine is a Schedule I controlled substance, categorized as a hallucinogen, making it illegal to buy, sell, or possess in the state of Florida without a license at any purity level or any form whatsoever. The language in the Florida statute says tyramine is illegal in "any material, compound, mixture, or preparation that contains any quantity of [tyramine] or that contains any of [its] salts, isomers, including optical, positional, or geometric isomers, and salts of isomers, if the existence of such salts, isomers, and salts of isomers is possible within the specific chemical designation."

This ban is likely the product of lawmakers overly eager to ban substituted phenethylamines, which tyramine is, in the mistaken belief that ring-substituted phenethylamines are hallucinogenic drugs like the 2C series of psychedelic substituted phenethylamines. The further banning of tyramine's optical isomers, positional isomers, or geometric isomers, and salts of isomers where they exist, means that meta-tyramine and phenylethanolamine, a substance found in every living human body, and other common, non-hallucinogenic substances are also illegal to buy, sell, or possess in Florida. Given that tyramine occurs naturally in many foods and drinks (most commonly as a by-product of bacterial fermentation), e.g. wine, cheese, and chocolate, Florida's total ban on the substance may prove difficult to enforce.

Notes

References 

Migraine
Monoamine oxidase inhibitors
Norepinephrine-dopamine releasing agents
Peripherally selective drugs
Phenethylamine alkaloids
Phenethylamines
TAAR1 agonists
Trace amines